Francis E. Flotron Jr. (born December 23, 1954 in St. Louis) is an American former Republican politician who served in the Missouri Senate and the Missouri House of Representatives where he rose to the level of House Assistant Minority Floor Leader.  In 1988, he was the first Missouri legislator to receive the National Federation of Independence Business "Small Business Guardian" award.

Flotron graduated from DeSmet Jesuit High School and Washington University with a bachelor's degree in business administration.  After he left the state legislature, he became known as the only Republican male lobbyist with a ponytail in Jefferson City.

References

1954 births
20th-century American politicians
Republican Party members of the Missouri House of Representatives
Republican Party Missouri state senators
Living people